The 2013–14 season has been Cagliari Calcio's 11th consecutive season in Serie A. The team competed in Serie A and the Coppa Italia.

Players

Squad information

Competitions

Serie A

League table

References

Cagliari Calcio seasons
Cagliari